Søren Andersen (16 July 1937 – 16 July 1960) was a Danish amateur association football player in the striker position, who played for BK Frem in Denmark. He was the top goalscorer of the 1957 Danish football championship, and played four games and scored two goals for the Denmark national under-21 football team.

Andersen was one of eight players killed in an air crash near Copenhagen travelling to a trial match before the 1960 Olympic tournament.

External links
Danish national team profile

1937 births
1960 deaths
Danish men's footballers
Denmark under-21 international footballers
Boldklubben Frem players
Victims of aviation accidents or incidents in 1960
Association football forwards
Footballers killed in the 1960 Danish football air crash